Cameron County Courthouse may refer to:

 Cameron County Courthouse (1882) in Brownsville, Texas
 Cameron County Courthouse (1914) in Brownsville, Texas
 Cameron County Courthouse (1980), as covered in List of county courthouses in Texas
 Cameron County Courthouse (Pennsylvania) in Emporium, Pennsylvania